Steven Feuerstein is an author focusing  on the Oracle database PL/SQL language, having written ten books on PL/SQL, and one book on mySQL, all published by O'Reilly Media. His signature book, Oracle PL/SQL Programming,
which many consider the "bible" for PL/SQL developers, was first published in September 1993. It has grown from 916 pages in 1993 to over 1000 pages in its 6th edition, published 20 years later.

Career
Feuerstein has developed software since 1980. He spent five years with Oracle Corporation (1987–1992) and served as PL/SQL evangelist for Quest Software from January 2001 to 2013. In March 2014, he re-joined Oracle Corporation as an Architect and leads a team of Oracle Developer Advocates.
Between 1999 and 2008, he focused his attention on improving the testing of PL/SQL programs, first by starting the open-source framework utPLSQL for unit testing PL/SQL, later on through the creation of Quest Code Tester for Oracle, which automates PL/SQL code testing.
Steven was one of the original Oracle ACE Directors and publishes regularly in Oracle Magazine and in the ODTUG magazine.

In April 2010, Feuerstein launched the PL/SQL Challenge, a daily quiz on Oracle PL/SQL that quickly attracted over 1,000 daily players, making it one of the most active PL/SQL-related websites on the Internet. In 2011, Feuerstein added the PL/SQL Channel, which offers video-based training on the Oracle PL/SQL language.

In March 2014, Feuerstein re-joined Oracle Corporation as an evangelist. He then formed the Developer Advocates team to help Oracle Database users take full advantage of this database to build their applications. The PL/SQL Challenge was transformed into the Oracle Dev Gym, which offers quizzes, workouts and classes on SQL, PL/SQL, and other Oracle technologies.

Books 
 Advanced Oracle PL/SQL Programming with Packages, O'Reilly Media, October 1996, 
 with Charles Dye, John Beresniewicz.Oracle Built-in Packages, O'Reilly Media, May 1998, 
 with John Beresniewicz, Chip Dawes. Oracle PL/SQL Built-ins Pocket Reference, O'Reilly Media, October 1998, 
 Oracle PL/SQL Programming: Guide to Oracle8i Features, O'Reilly Media, October 1999, 
 with Andrew Odewahn. Oracle PL/SQL Programming: A Developer's Workbook, O'Reilly Media, May 2000, 
 with Bill Pribyl. Learning Oracle PL/SQL, O'Reilly Media, November 2001, 
 with Arup Nanda. Oracle PL/SQL for DBAs, First Edition, O'Reilly Media, October 2005, 
 with Guy Harrison. MySQL Stored Procedure Programming: Building High-Performance Web Applications in MySQL, O'Reilly Media, March 2006, 
 Oracle PL/SQL Best Practices, Second Edition, O'Reilly Media, October 2007, 
 with Bill Pribyl, Chip Dawes. Oracle PL/SQL Language Pocket Reference, Fourth Edition, O'Reilly Media, October 2007, 
 with Bill Pribyl. Oracle PL/SQL Programming, Fifth Edition, O'Reilly Media, September 2009, 
 Oracle PL/SQL Programming, 6th Edition Covers Versions Through Oracle Database 12c, February 2014

References

External links 
 The Cyberworld of Steven Feuerstein (personal homepage)
 The PL/SQL Challenge (daily PL/SQL quiz)
 The PL/SQL Channel (video trainings on Oracle PL/SQL)
 FeuerThoughts Steven Feuerstein's blog, often about non-technical issues
 Best Practice PL/SQL with Steven Feuerstein, on Oracle Technology Network
 PL/SQL Obsession Steven Feuerstein's online portal for all things PL/SQL on Quest Software's community portal toadworld.com
 Feuerthoughts: An Interview with Steven Feuerstein by Iggy Fernandez, Editor of the Northern California Oracle Users Group (NoCOUG) Journal for the  August 2006 issue
 An interview with Steven Feuerstein A recent interview on databasedesign-resource.com

Oracle employees
Living people
Quest Software
O'Reilly writers
Year of birth missing (living people)